ACG Motorsports, formerly known as Chris Cockrum Racing, is an American professional stock car racing team that currently competes in the NASCAR Xfinity Series. The team currently fields the No. TBA Chevrolet Camaro part-time for Chris Cockrum, who also is the team's owner.

History

Xfinity Series

Car No. 25 history
Chris Cockrum has fielded the No. 25 Chevrolet Camaro part-time since his team opened in 2015. In 2017, P. J. Jones attempted to drive the car at Watkins Glen, but failed to qualify.

In 2019, the team returned and they partnered with Rick Ware Racing at Daytona in February and Talladega, and Cockrum drove the RWR No. 17 at those two races. At Daytona in July, Cockrum fielded his own team again with his own owner points (independent from Rick Ware Racing) under the name ACG Motorsports (ACG standing for sponsor Advanced Communications Group), and using the No. 25.

Car No. 25 Results

References

External links
 

American auto racing teams
NASCAR teams
Auto racing teams established in 2015